

Adolf Strauß (6 September 1879 – 20 March 1973) was a German officer who served in the Imperial German Army, the Reichswehr, and later as a general in the Heer of Nazi Germany's Wehrmacht during World War II.

As commander of the II Army Corps, Strauß participated in the German Invasion of Poland. On 30 May 1940, he was appointed commander of the 9th Army in France. Strauß participated in Operation Barbarossa with Army Group Centre. In January 1942 he was replaced in command of the 9th Army by Walter Model following the initial breakthrough of the Soviet forces during commencement of the Rzhev Battles. He died on 20 March 1973 in Lübeck.

As with all German armies on the Eastern Front, Strauß's 9th Army implemented the criminal Commissar Order.

Adolf Strauß is mentioned by author Sven Hassel in his work of fiction Wheels of Terror.

Decorations

 Knight's Cross of the Iron Cross on 27 October 1939 as General der Infanterie and commanding general of the II. Armeekorps

References

Citations

Bibliography

  
 Mitcham, SW (2010) : Men of Barbarossa  
 

1879 births
1973 deaths
People from Börde (district)
German Army generals of World War II
Colonel generals of the German Army (Wehrmacht)
Recipients of the Knight's Cross of the Iron Cross
Recipients of the Hanseatic Cross (Bremen)
German prisoners of war in World War II held by the United Kingdom
People from the Province of Saxony
Recipients of the clasp to the Iron Cross, 1st class
Major generals of the Reichswehr
Military personnel from Saxony-Anhalt
German Army personnel of World War I